The Seattle Turks were a minor league baseball team based in Seattle, WA who played a single season (1909) in the Northwestern League.  In their only year of existence, the team won a Northwestern League pennant with a record of 109-58.

On June 29, 2013, the Seattle Mariners MLB team played as the Seattle Turks in one-off throwback uniforms against the Chicago Cubs. Safeco Field was renamed Yesler Way Park for the game.

References

Baseball in Seattle
Baseball teams established in 1909
1909 establishments in Washington (state)
Defunct minor league baseball teams
Defunct baseball teams in Washington (state)
Professional baseball teams in Washington (state)
Baseball teams disestablished in 1909